CGE may refer to:

Companies
 Canadian General Electric
 Compagnie Générale des Eaux, renamed Vivendi SA in 1998 and merged with Canal+ and Seagram in 2000 to become Vivendi Universal
 Compagnie Générale d'Electricité, became part of Alcatel
 Compagnia Generale di Elettricità S.p.A. Italy, part of General Electric, USA
 Czech Games Edition, a Czech boardgames publisher

Education
 Conférence des grandes écoles (CGE), France
 Center for Gifted Education, Virginia

Politics
 Conservative Group for Europe, sometimes called the Conservative Europe Group (CEG)

Sciences
 Caudal Ganglionic Eminence, in neuroscience
 Computable general equilibrium models, in economics

Places
 The IATA code for Cambridge–Dorchester Airport in Cambridge, Maryland